Sverdlovsk Raion is a raion (district) in Luhansk Oblast in eastern Ukraine. The administrative center of the raion is the town of Sverdlovsk, which is incorporated separately as a city of oblast significance and does not belong to the raion.

History 
Since 2014 the raion has not been under the control of the Ukrainian government and has been part of the Luhansk People's Republic which continues using it as an administrative unit.

The administrative center of the raion is the city of Sverdlovsk. Sverdlovsk was previously incorporated as a city of oblast significance and did not belong to the raion, but in 2015 was merged into the raion.

In 2016, the Verkhovna Rada renamed Sverdlovsk Dovzhansk and Sverdlovsk Raion Dovzhansk Raion, according to the law prohibiting the names of Communist origin. On 18 July 2020 as part of the administrative reform of Ukraine, which reduced the number of raions of Luhansk Oblast to eight, the raion has been significantly extended. The Luhansk People's Republic continues to use the old name and the old area of the raion.

Population

Demographics 
As of the 2001 Ukrainian census:

Ethnicity
 Ukrainians: 69.9%
 Russians: 25.9%
 Belarusians: 0.6%

References

Former raions of Luhansk Oblast
Sverdlovsk Raion
Soviet toponymy in Ukraine
1938 establishments in Ukraine